John Marshall (or Marshal) (died 1496) was a Bishop of Llandaff in Wales.

John was a fellow of Merton College, Oxford and a canon of Windsor. On 6 September 1478, he was consecrated Bishop of Llandaff. He is well remembered for having repaired the damage done to the cathedral during Owain Glyndŵr's reign. He also erected a new bishop's throne and a reredos, parts of which survives. He died in January or February 1496 and was buried in Llandaff Cathedral where his monumental effigy may still be seen.

References

External links
Gwent local history the journal of Gwent Local History Council. | 66 | 1989 | Welsh Journals - The National Library of Wales
Bishops of Llandaff | British History Online
https://web.archive.org/web/20131029194117/http://www.llandaffcathedral.org.uk/bell1204.pdf

1496 deaths
Bishops of Llandaff
Fellows of Merton College, Oxford
15th-century English Roman Catholic bishops
Canons of Windsor
15th-century Welsh clergy
Year of birth unknown
Burials at Llandaff Cathedral